Jeffrey Eugene Davis (born January 26, 1960) is a former American college and professional football player who was a linebacker in the National Football League (NFL) for six seasons during the 1980s.  He played college football for Clemson University, and received All-American honors.  He played professionally for the NFL's Tampa Bay Buccaneers.

Early years
Davis was born in Greensboro, North Carolina.

College career
Davis played college football at Clemson. While there he set many records and helped Clemson defeat the Nebraska Cornhuskers in the 1982 Orange Bowl to win the National Championship. In his four years at Clemson from 1978 to 1981 he started 35 of 40 games, recording 469 tackles, four sacks, and four interceptions.

Davis was inducted into the College Football Hall of Fame in 2007.

Professional career
He became a starter during his second season and led the team in tackles three times. He finished his career starting 72 of 83 games, and compiled 662 tackles, four sacks and three interceptions in his six-season pro career.

Personal
Davis' twin sons J.D. and Judah were both linebackers at Clemson between 2015 and 2018.

References

External links
Tampa Bay Buccaneers bio

1960 births
Living people
All-American college football players
American football linebackers
Clemson Tigers football players
College Football Hall of Fame inductees
Tampa Bay Buccaneers players